Melanie Bilenker (born 1978) is an American craft artist from New York City who lives and works in Philadelphia, Pennsylvania. Her work is primarily in contemporary hair jewelry. In 2010 she received a Pew Fellowship in the Arts. Bilenker uses her own hair to "draw" images of contemporary life and self-portraits. The use of hair is an attempt at showing the person, and the moments left or shed behind.

Collections 
Donna Schneier Collection
Metropolitan Museum of Art
Museum of Fine Arts, Boston
Museum of Fine Arts, Houston
Philadelphia Museum of Art
Racine Art Museum
Smithsonian American Art Museum
Yale University Art Gallery

Exhibitions 

 40 Under 40: Craft Futures (July 19, 2012 - February 3, 2013), Smithsonian American Art Museum, Renwick Gallery, Washington, D.C.
 Wear It or Not (March 12, 2013 - June 2, 2013), Museum of Art and Design, New York
Jewelry, From Pearls to Platinum to Plastic (June 27, 2015 - January 1, 2017), Newark Museum, New Jersey
Outrageous Ornament: Extreme Jewelry in the 21st Century (October 21, 2018 - January 27, 2019), Katonah Museum, New York

Awards 

 2015   Peter S. Reed Foundation Individual Artist Grant
 2010   Pew Fellowship in the Arts Individual Artist Fellowship
 2007   Pennsylvania Council on the Arts Individual Artist Fellowship
 2003   Sienna Gallery EA Award

References 

1978 births
Living people
21st-century American women artists
American jewellers
21st-century American artists
Artists from New York City
University of the Arts (Philadelphia) alumni
Women jewellers